Bruce Smith (born 18 September 1958) is a Canadian luger. He competed in the men's singles event at the 1980 Winter Olympics.

References

External links
 

1958 births
Living people
Canadian male lugers
Olympic lugers of Canada
Lugers at the 1980 Winter Olympics
Sportspeople from Toronto